Franco Antonio Bano (born 30 March 1986 in La Plata) is an Argentinian professional footballer who last played for AEK Kouklia in the Cypriot First Division. He has previously played in his homeland for Tiro Federal and Miramar Misiones in Uruguay.

Career
Bano arrived Miramar Misiones in mid 2008 to play in the Uruguayan Second Level. He scored his first goal with the club on 4 October 2008 against Progreso.

In mid 2010, he achieved with the club the promotion to the Uruguayan Top Level after winning Juventud in the Second Promotion Playoff finals.

During Miramar Misiones's 2010–11 season, Bano made 18 appearances in the Uruguayan Primera División, in which was sent off 3 times.

After playing for Miramar for three years, he joined Bulgarian side Ludogorets Razgrad at the beginning of the A PFG 2011–12 season.

In September 2012, Bano signed a new deal with Uruguayan side Atenas de San Carlos.

On 23 July 2013, he signed a contract with Cypriot side AEK Kouklia.

References

1986 births
Living people
Association football defenders
Argentine footballers
Argentine expatriate footballers
Estudiantes de La Plata footballers
Tiro Federal footballers
Miramar Misiones players
PFC Ludogorets Razgrad players
Atenas de San Carlos players
AEK Kouklia F.C. players
Cypriot First Division players
Expatriate footballers in Bulgaria
Expatriate footballers in Cyprus
Expatriate footballers in Uruguay
Footballers from La Plata